Lake Bella Vista may refer to:

Lake Bella Vista (Michigan) 
Lake Bella Vista in Bella Vista, Arkansas